In mathematics, specifically in the field of numerical analysis, Kummer's transformation of series is a method used to accelerate the convergence of an infinite series. The method was first suggested by Ernst Kummer in 1837.

Technique 
Let

be an infinite sum whose value we wish to compute, and let

be an infinite sum with comparable terms whose value is known.
If the limit

exists, then  is always also a sequence going to zero and the series given by the difference, converges. 
If , this new series differs from the original  and, under broad conditions, converges more rapidly.
We may then compute  as

,

where  is a constant. Where , the terms can be written as the product . 
If  for all , the sum is over a component-wise product of two sequences going to zero,

.

Example
Consider the Leibniz formula for π:

We group terms in pairs as

where we identify
.
We apply Kummer's method to accelerate , which will give an accelerated sum for computing .

Let

This is a telescoping series with sum value .
In this case 

and so Kummer's transformation formula above gives 

which converges much faster than the original series.

Coming back to Leibniz formula, we obtain a representation of  that separates  and involves a fastly converging sum over just the squared even numbers ,

See also
 Euler transform

References

External links
 

Numerical analysis